Maria Markova is a Russian poet.

Biography
She was born in 1982 in a small town in Siberia. In her early childhood she moved to the Vologda oblast. Markova started writing poetry very early. In 2005-2007 she published two small brochures (without any success), but a little later few journal publications have brought her fame. In 2008 she joined the Union of Russian Writers. Most authoritative Russian literary magazines published her works (Znamya, Literaturnaya Gazeta, Druzhba narodov etc.).

In 2008-2010 Maria Markova received few prestigious literary awards, including the personal Grant of the Russian Ministry of Culture. In 2011 Markova received the Presidential Award for young art workers "for her contribution to the traditions of Russian poetry". In the same year she was recognized as a "Writer of the Year" by the magazine "Rendez-vous".

In 2012 Markova published her first book Solominka (The Straw).

External links
 Maria Markova on the Web-Site of President of Russia (Russian)
 Publications of works in literary magazines (Russian)

References

1982 births
Russian women poets
Russian-language poets
People from Vologda
Living people